Optimal cutting temperature compound (OCT compound) is used to embed tissue samples prior to frozen sectioning on a microtome-cryostat. This process is undertaken so as to mount slices (sections) of a sample onto slides for analysis.

Components 
As stated on the bottle:
 10.24% polyvinyl alcohol
 4.26% polyethylene glycol
 85.5% non-reactive ingredients"

See also
Microtome
Cryostat

References

Further reading

Histology